Rajesh Kumar (born 15 September 1969) is an Indian wrestler. He competed in the men's freestyle 48 kg at the 1988 Summer Olympics.

References

1969 births
Living people
Indian male sport wrestlers
Olympic wrestlers of India
Wrestlers at the 1988 Summer Olympics
Place of birth missing (living people)
Recipients of the Arjuna Award
20th-century Indian people